EmuBands is a digital music distribution service founded in 2005. EmuBands provides a simple but powerful digital music distribution service for artists, and record labels, to sell music online through iTunes, Spotify, Amazon.com, Google Play and many more of the world's digital music services.

In a non-exclusive deal, artists and labels earn 100% of the royalties generated from sales, and maintain full ownership and control of their rights, and with a simple one-off pricing model, there are no annual fees.

History and overview
Based in Glasgow, EmuBands offer unsigned artists and independent record labels access to selling their music online.

EmuBands caught the attention of Rhodri Marsden, writer for The Independent, when he used their services for his article on DIY music.

As well as digital music distribution, EmuBands play an active role in educating the public on areas within the music industry. Managing Director, Ally Gray, takes regular seats on panels for various seminars and conferences.

In late 2012, EmuBands featured at Aberdeen Music Open Day, Born To Be Wide - ‘Release Yourself’, and Norwich Sound & Vision.

Retail stores
EmuBands distributes to major digital music retailers worldwide. Examples of their store partners include:
iTunes
Spotify
Amazon Music
Google Play
Deezer
7digital
Tidal

Notable artists
EmuBands have distributed music for the following artists:
Glasvegas
Paul Weller
Leona Lewis
Twin Atlantic
Stevie McCrorie
Idlewild
Simple Minds
The Strypes
Don Broco
Universal Thee
Sunset Sons
P8NTYR
Sean Slick

References

External links
Official website

Companies established in 2005
Online music stores of the United Kingdom
Digital audio distributors